Bolshevism (from Bolshevik) is a revolutionary socialist current of Soviet Marxist–Leninist political thought and political regime associated with the formation of a rigidly centralized, cohesive and disciplined party of social revolution, focused on overthrowing the existing capitalist state system, seizing power and establishing the "dictatorship of the proletariat". 

Bolshevism originated at the beginning of the 20th century in Russia and was associated with the activities of the Bolshevik faction within the Russian Social Democratic Labour Party – and first of all, the founder of the faction, Vladimir Lenin. Remaining on the soil of Marxism, Bolshevism at the same time absorbed elements of the ideology and practice of the revolutionaries of the second half of the 19th century (Sergey Nechaev, Pyotr Tkachev, Nikolay Chernyshevsky) and had many points of contact with such domestic left–wing radical movements as populism. The main theorist of Bolshevism was Vladimir Lenin; besides him, the theoreticians of Bolshevism include Leon Trotsky, Nikolai Bukharin and Yevgeni Preobrazhensky.

In October 1917, the Bolshevik faction organized an armed uprising against the Provisional Government, formed by other (including socialist) parties and seized power .

Some researchers attribute to Bolshevik theory the program of Joseph Stalin, who headed the All–Union Communist Party (Bolsheviks) and at the same time possessed full state power in the Soviet Union. However, others (both Stalin's contemporaries and later) do not confuse "Bolshevism" and "Stalinism" proper, considering them to be multidirectional (revolutionary and thermidorian) phenomena.

The expression "Bolshevism", as well as "communism" later, has become established in Western historiography in the sense of a certain set of features of Soviet power in a certain political period. At present, the very name "Bolsheviks" is actively used by various groups of Marxist–Leninists and Trotskyists.

History

The concept of Bolshevism arose at the Second Congress of the Russian Social Democratic Labour Party (1903) as a result of the split of the party into two factions: supporters of Lenin and the rest. One of the main reasons for the split was the question of a party of a new type. In the course of work on the Charter of the Russian Social Democratic Labor Party, Vladimir Lenin and Yuliy Martov proposed two different wordings of the clause on party membership. Lenin – a party member is a citizen who recognizes the program and charter, pays membership fees and works in one of the party organizations. Martov suggested limiting the charter to the first two requirements. During the elections to the central organs of the party, the majority was won by supporters of the Leninist formulation, after which Lenin began to call his faction "Bolsheviks", while Martov called his supporters "Mensheviks". Although in the subsequent history of the Russian Social Democratic Labor Party, Lenin's supporters often found themselves in the minority, they were assigned the politically advantageous name "Bolsheviks".

As Lenin's biographer Robert Service points out, the division of the newly created party into two factions "plunged Russian Marxists into a state of shock". All but the extreme left Petersburg Marxists disagreed with Lenin's party policy.

At the Fourth Congress of the Russian Social Democratic Labor Party in 1906, the organizational unity of the party was temporarily restored. At the Fifth Congress, the Central Committee was elected, which, due to disagreements between the Bolsheviks and the Mensheviks, turned out to be unworkable, and the Bolshevik Center, headed by Vladimir Lenin, which was created during the Congress by Bolshevik delegates at one of its factional meetings, arbitrarily took over the leadership of the Bolshevik organizations of the party.

At the Sixth (Prague) Conference of the Russian Social Democratic Labor Party, held on January 18–30, 1912, which constituted itself as the all–party conference of the Russian Social Democratic Labor Party and the supreme organ of the party, almost exclusively Lenin's supporters were represented. By this time, the central committee of the party had virtually ceased to exist (its last plenum was held in January 1910), and the party found itself without an official leading center. In this regard, a Bolshevik Central Committee was elected at the Prague Conference.

In 1916, Lenin wrote his work Imperialism as the Highest Stage of Capitalism, which was a major contribution to the development of classical Marxism in the new conditions. In this work the thesis about the unevenness of economic and political development of capitalism in the epoch of imperialism was expressed and theoretically grounded, which leads to the conclusion about the possibility of the victory of socialism initially in a few or in one single country, which is not yet economically developed enough – such as Russia – provided that the head of the revolutionary movement will be a disciplined avant–garde, ready to go all the way to the establishment of the dictatorship of the proletariat.

Immediately after the outbreak of the World War, Lenin and his supporters advanced the slogan of the defeat of tsarism in the war and the transformation of the imperialist war into a civil war. It was with this that Lenin's criticism of the so–called "social–chauvinists", who supported their governments in the world war, was connected. Lenin viewed the civil war as "an inevitable continuation, development and intensification of the class struggle".

By the beginning of the February Revolution, the leading figures of the Bolshevik faction were mainly in exile or in emigration, and therefore the Bolsheviks did not take an organized part in it. The Bolshevik leaders who returned from exile, who, along with the Mensheviks and Socialist Revolutionaries, became members of the Petrograd Soviet, at first tended to cooperate with the Provisional Government. From the very beginning, while still abroad, Lenin insisted on the immediate break of the Petrograd Soviet with the Provisional Government in order to actively prepare for the transition from the bourgeois–democratic to the next, "proletarian" stage of the revolution, the seizure of power and the end of the war. Returning to Russia, he came up with a new program of action for the Bolshevik party – the April Theses – in which he put on the agenda the demand for the transfer of all power to the Soviets in the interests of the proletariat and the poorest peasantry. Faced with resistance even among the representatives of "theoretical", "scientific" Bolshevism, Lenin managed to overcome it, relying on the support of the lower classes – local party organizations, adherents of immediate practical action. In the course of the unfolding controversy about the possibility of socialism in Russia, Lenin rejected all the critical arguments of the Mensheviks, socialist revolutionaries and other political opponents about the country's unpreparedness for a socialist revolution due to its economic backwardness, weakness, lack of culture and organization of the working masses, including the proletariat, about the danger the split of the revolutionary democratic forces and the inevitability of a civil war.

In April 1917, the split of the Russian Social Democratic Labor Party was finalized. During a heated discussion at the 7th All–Russian (April) Conference of the Russian Social Democratic Labor Party (Bolsheviks) ( April 24–29), the April Theses received the support of the majority of delegates from the localities and formed the basis of the policy of the entire party. The Bolshevik faction became known as the Russian Social Democratic Labor Party (Bolsheviks).

The Russian Social Democratic Labour Party was renamed the Russian Social Democratic Labor Party (Bolsheviks) at the 7th (April) Conference in 1917. In March 1918, the party adopted the name of the Russian Communist Party (Bolsheviks), and in December 1925, the All–Union Communist Party (Bolsheviks). At the 19th Congress in October 1952, the All–Union Communist Party (Bolsheviks) was renamed the Communist Party of the Soviet Union.

In 1990, at the last, 28th Congress of the Communist Party of the Soviet Union, during the legalization of political platforms within the Communist Party of the Soviet Union, the Bolshevik Platform was formed, giving rise to several modern political parties and social movements.

Bolshevism and private property
Realizing the Leninist slogan "plunder the loot", the Bolsheviks en masse carried out a complete confiscation (expropriation) from the owners of private property, which they considered acquired through the exploitation of the working people, that is, the robbery of the workers. At the same time, the Bolsheviks never found out whether private property was obtained through their own labor, or through the exploitation of other people, whether the owners adequately paid for hired labor, what part of the confiscated private property the owner created with his own labor.

Bolsheviks and the Russian Revolution
There is an opinion that the Bolsheviks strove for revolution, regardless of the political situation and historical realities. This is how the famous Social Democrat Alexander Parvus wrote in 1918:

Support for the Bolsheviks by the people
According to the British historian Orlando Figes, the opinion that the Bolsheviks were raised to the top of power by massive popular support for their party is not true and is a delusion. According to Figes, the October Uprising in Petrograd was a coup d'état supported by only a small part of the population. Figes explains the success of the Bolsheviks by the fact that the latter were the only political party that uncompromisingly advocated the slogan "all power to the Soviets", which gained great popularity in 1917 after the unsuccessful Revolt of General Kornilov. As Figes points out, in the fall of 1917, there was a stream of resolutions from factories, from villages, from army units, calling for the formation of a Soviet government. At the same time, the authors of the resolutions understood "the power of the Soviets" as the All–Russian Council with the participation of all socialist parties.

Meanwhile, the commitment of the Bolsheviks to the principle of Soviet power was not at all so unconditional. In July 1917, when the Bolshevik Party was unable to obtain a majority in the Soviets of Workers' and Soldiers' Deputies, it "temporarily removed" the slogan "all Power to the Soviets!". After the October coup, during the so–called "triumphal march of Soviet power" in those cases when individual councils did not agree to become the organs of the dictatorship of the Russian Social–Democratic Workers' Party (Bolsheviks), the Bolsheviks did not hesitate to disperse them and replace them by emergency bodies – revolutionary committees, military revolutionary committees, etc.

Alexander Parvus wrote in 1918:

Supporters and opponents

The Bolsheviks were supported, although not without criticism of their political practice, by left–wing theorists in Europe, such as Rosa Luxemburg and Karl Liebknecht.

At the same time, this political trend rejected the centrist social democrats, for example, Karl Kautsky and the extreme left supporters of "workers' council communism", for example, Otto Rühle and Antonie Pannekoek. The answer to the extreme leftist criticism was given by Lenin in the brochure "Childhood Illness of "Leftism" in Communism", in turn Antonie Pannekoek answered to Vladimir Lenin in the work "World Revolution and Communist Tactics".

In the 1920s and 1930s, the Left Opposition to Stalin adopted the self–designation "Bolshevik–Leninists", thereby emphasizing its continuity with the revolutionary tradition as opposed to Thermidorian Stalinism. After the political trials of the 1930s, most of the "Leninist Guards" were repressed. Proceeding from this, there is an opinion that Bolshevism as a phenomenon has left the historical scene:

But on the other hand, a number of scientists are of the opinion that Bolshevism has undergone changes over time, and as a phenomenon, it ended only in the early 1990s.

Some modern scholars agree that Bolshevism:

In Western political science, some authors analyze Bolshevism from the standpoint of similarities and differences with fascism and Nazism.

According to sociologist Boris Kagarlitsky, one of the central contradictions of the post–revolutionary policy of the Bolsheviks is defined as a consequence of the historically developed socio–political situation in Russia:

In journalism, some authors also understand it as a synonym for extreme extremism, ideological fanaticism, intolerance, and a propensity for violence.

Social democratic views
Bolshevism was criticized by the Social Democrats. Thus, the famous Social Democrat Alexander Parvus wrote in 1918:

Criticism and historical estimates
According to the philosopher and linguist Nikolay Trubetskoy:

The authors of The Black Book of Communism note:

Russian President Vladimir Putin, answering questions in the Federation Council on June 27, 2012, accused the Bolshevik leadership of betraying national interests – "the Bolsheviks committed an act of national betrayal..." as a result of which Russia lost the First World War – "...the result of the betrayal of the then government".

See also
Bolsheviks
Russian Social Democratic Labour Party
Russian Civil War

Notes

References

Sources
Nikolay Berdyaev. The Origins and Meaning of Russian Communism. Moscow, 1990

Ludwig von Mises. Socialism. Economic And Sociological Analysis – Moscow: "Catallaxy", 1994 – Page 416 – 

Bertrand Russell. The Practice and Theory of Bolshevism / [Author's Epilogue by V. S. Markov; Academy of Sciences of the Soviet Union, Scientific Council "History of Revolutions and Social Movements"] – Moscow: Science, 1991

Vladimir Lenin
Joseph Stalin
Marxism–Leninism
Stalinism
History of Russia
Bolsheviks